The Younger Lady is the informal name given to a mummy discovered within tomb KV35 in the Valley of the Kings by archaeologist Victor Loret in 1898. The mummy also has been given the designation KV35YL ("YL" for "Younger Lady") and 61072, and currently resides in the Egyptian Museum in Cairo. Through recent DNA tests, this mummy has been identified as the mother of the pharaoh Tutankhamun and a daughter of pharaoh Amenhotep III and his Great Royal Wife Tiye. Early speculation that this mummy was the remains of Nefertiti was argued to be incorrect, as nowhere is Nefertiti accorded the title "King's daughter."

Discovery
The mummy was found adjacent to two other mummies in KV35: a young boy who died at the approximate age of ten and is thought to be Webensenu, and an older woman, who has been identified as Tiye by the recent DNA studies on Tutankhamun's lineage. The three mummies were found together in a small antechamber of the tomb of Amenhotep II, lying naked, side-by-side, and unidentified. All three mummies had been extensively damaged by ancient tomb robbers.

Description of the mummy

Dr. Grafton Elliot Smith examined the mummy in his survey of the ancient royal mummies conducted at the beginning of the twentieth century. He immediately noted that the body was that of a woman, not a man as thought by Loret and later authors; this mistake he ascribed to the fact the mummy's head was shaved. CT scanning suggested an age of twenty-five to thirty-five years at death based on the condition of the epiphyseal union and the closure of the cranial sutures.

There is a small oval-shaped hole in the front of the skull; this hole has sharp, beveled, and festooned edges. Additionally, bone fragments are seen inside the skull. This, together with lack of evidence for attempted healing or sclerosis indicate this is a postmortem injury. The skull cavity contains her shrunken and desiccated brain and dura mater; there is no evidence of embalming material within the cranial cavity. This is unusual, as all other late Eighteenth Dynasty mummies show some attempt to remove the brain. Linen packs were placed in front of the eyes, and subcutaneous packing is present in her right cheek and mid-face.

The Younger Lady has a gaping wound in the left side of her mouth and cheek. It was thought that this wound, which also destroyed part of the jaw, had been the result of the actions of tomb robbers, but more recent examinations of the mummy in 2003 by a scientific team from the University of York under Joann Fletcher, and CT scanning as part of The Egyptian Mummy Project determined that the wound had happened prior to death. The injury involves her cheek, left maxillary sinus, alveolar process, and part of her jaw; it shows no evidence of healing. Furthermore, pieces of most of the woman's fractured facial bones are missing; a rolled embalming pack of resin-impregnated linen was placed on top of the wound and partly beneath the remaining skin, which lends further support to the idea that the injury took place prior to mummification. The researchers consider this injury to have been fatal, and the result of a heavy object striking the woman's face. Hawass considers the injury to be accidental, involving the woman receiving a strong kick from an animal, such as a horse, while Hermann Schögl suggested that she was killed in a chariot crash or accident. Ashraf Selim viewed the wound as too violent to be the result of an accident. In his opinion, the Lady had been injured in an act of deliberate violence. Julian Heath suggests that the wound was likely the result of an axe blow.

The woman has several missing teeth due to her facial injury, one of which is seen inside her mouth. The upper wisdom teeth are non-erupted; her teeth have no visible attrition, and no occlusal irregularities.

The front wall of the chest sustained major damage at the hands of ancient tomb robbers, creating a large hole. Her heart was left in place, and remains visible within the body. The diaphragm was not removed but had two holes made to allow removal of the lungs. The torso was packed with both linen fibers smeared with resin, and linen packs treated with resin. One of the resin-treated linen packs was placed within the pelvis. The pelvic floor was noted to be widely open and smeared with resin. It was possibly used as a route to remove the viscera during the mummification process and is a possible example of perineal evisceration. There is a subcutaneous filling at the back of the right hip. The pelvis contains small postmortem fractures, and the legs have also been damaged; the front half of both feet are missing.

Don Brothwell states that there is another wound below her left breast, likely a puncture or stab wound. However, this claim is not supported by any photos.

The left arm of the mummy extends beside her body, with the hand placed over the left hip; the right arm has been snapped off close to the shoulder, presumably by ancient tomb robbers. This break has gaping ends, with no evidence of attempted healing. The missing right arm of the mummy was the cause of a minor controversy among researchers. Two severed arms were located within KV35, and either one was thought likely to belong to the Younger Lady. One was a bent arm with a clenched fist, while the other was a straight arm. It was typical for the mummies of royal Egyptian women to be positioned with one of their arms bent and the other one in a straight position. The arm more likely to be bent was the left. Ashraf Selim of The Egyptian Mummy Project examined both arms to resolve the controversy. The bent arm was compared to the mummy's attached left hand, and was found to be too long to belong to the same woman; the bones of the two arms also were found "different in consistency". The straight arm was found to be of similar length and similar bone density, so the project concluded that the straight arm most likely belonged to the Younger Lady. The newly identified right arm of the Younger Lady has two breaks, "one in the upper arm and one at the wrist"; the hand has been broken off.

The Younger Lady has a double-pierced left earlobe; the right earlobe is damaged. Pierced ears were rather common for women of the New Kingdom of Egypt, including royals and non-royal women, so her pierced ear cannot help researchers determine her identity or social position. Similarly inconclusive for identification purposes was the discovery of a wig in KV35, which could have belonged to the Younger Lady. Supporters of the theory identifying the woman with Nefertiti, pointed to the wig's perceived similarities with the type of wigs used by Nefertiti. Although they are fashion items used by Egyptian women of the same era, they can not help identify the wig's user either.

Identity
There has been much speculation as to the identity of the Younger Lady. Upon discovery, Victor Loret believed the body to be that of a young man. A closer inspection by Smith confirmed that the mummy was that of a woman. Smith presumed she was a member of the royal family but considered her to be contemporary with Amenhotep II.

In 1999 independent researcher Marianne Luban proposed in a web article that the Younger Lady was the body of Nefertiti. This claim was repeated in 2003 by Fletcher. DNA tests have shown that this woman was the mother of Tutankhamun. The results also revealed she was a full-sister to her husband, the KV55 mummy, and that they were both the children of Amenhotep III and Tiye. This family relationship would lessen the possibility that the Younger Lady was either Nefertiti, or Akhenaten's secondary wife Kiya, because no known artifact accords titles to either of them as "King's sister" or "King's Daughter". The possibility of the Younger Lady being Sitamun, Isis, or Henuttaneb is considered unlikely, as they were Great Royal Wives of their father, Amenhotep III, and had Akhenaten married any of them, as Great Royal Wives, they would have become the principal queen of Egypt, rather than Nefertiti. The report concludes that the mummy is likely to be Nebetah or Beketaten, daughters of Amenhotep III and not known to have married their father, although he is known to have had eight daughters with Tiye.

There still are some Egyptologists who support the theory that the Younger Lady is Nefertiti or Kiya, but Nefertiti was not Akhenaten’s sister. Proponents of the genetic identification interpret the DNA results as being the result of three generations of first cousin marriage rather than a single, full-sibling marriage. No son is recorded for Nefertiti.

Despite the Younger Lady being the daughter of a pharaoh (Amenhotep III), a full sister and probable wife to a second pharaoh (Akhenaten), and the mother of a third pharaoh (Tutankhamun/Tutankhaten), she does not appear to have been a prominent figure in her lifetime. As of the 2010s, no inscription, relief, or statue dedicated to this young pharaoh's mother has been found. KV62, the tomb of Tutankhamun, contains mementos from his life and reign; none of these items ever mention his mother. This is in stark contrast to the influential mothers of the pharaohs of the Eighteenth Dynasty, who had a large presence in the reigns of their sons. Tiaa served as king's mother to Thutmose IV, Mutemwiya as king's mother to Amenhotep III, and Tiye as king's mother to Akhenaten. It seems likely that Tutankhamun/Tutankhaten never had a king's mother (mwt nswt) during his reign, indicating that she had died before his rise to the throne. This lends credence to the Younger Lady being a minor wife of Akhenaten who died before Tutankhamun became king. Willeke Wendrich also considers it likely that she was a minor wife or a concubine to Akhenaten. Wendrich notes that the pharaohs of Egypt typically had multiple wives. This often resulted in multiple sons serving as viable heirs to the throne, and creating the potential competition among the sons to gain the right to succeed their father.

Facial reconstruction
On 7 February 2018, The Younger Lady was featured on the seventh episode of the fourth season of Expedition Unknown, entitled "Great Women of Ancient Egypt". On the presumption that the mummy might be Nefertiti, a team led by Expedition Unknown's host Josh Gates used the preserved remains, modern technology, and artistry to present a reconstruction of what the Younger Lady would have looked like in full royal regalia. The bust was created by French paleoartist Élisabeth Daynès.

See also
List of unsolved deaths

References

External links 

14th-century BC births
14th-century BC deaths
14th-century BC Egyptian people
14th-century BC Egyptian women
1898 archaeological discoveries
Children of Amenhotep III
Ancient Egyptian mummies
Ancient murder victims
Egyptian murder victims
Egyptian Museum
Female murder victims
Murdered royalty
People murdered in Egypt
Princesses of the Eighteenth Dynasty of Egypt
Queens consort of the Eighteenth Dynasty of Egypt
Tutankhamun
Unidentified decedents
Unidentified murder victims
Unidentified people
Unsolved deaths
Wives of Akhenaten